Robert L. Crawley (fl. 1970–1984) was a Democratic member of the Massachusetts Senate.

References

Year of birth missing (living people)
Living people
Democratic Party Massachusetts state senators
20th-century American politicians
Place of birth missing (living people)